Caden Christopher Clark (born May 27, 2003) is an American professional soccer player who plays as an attacking midfielder for Bundesliga club RB Leipzig.

Club career

Early career
Born in Medina, Minnesota, Clark began his career with the youth setup of Minnesota Thunder in 2015. He also played for the FC Barcelona-sponsored Barça Residency Academy in Arizona. Clark went on a brief trial with Minnesota United in 2019, getting to know several players as well as then-head coach Adrian Heath.

New York Red Bulls II 
In February 2020, Clark was signed by USL Championship club New York Red Bulls II. He made his league debut for the club on July 17, 2020, against Hartford Athletic and scored his first goal on August 29, 2020, against Loudoun United FC.

New York Red Bulls 
On October 10, 2020, New York Red Bulls acquired his MLS rights from Minnesota United in exchange for $75,000 of General Allocation Money, and he was signed to New York's first team roster. Clark made his debut for New York Red Bulls and scored against Atlanta United on October 10, 2020, during a 1–0 win for the club, becoming the fifth youngest player to score in MLS. He followed up with a game tying goal from outside the box in his second appearance for the Red Bulls, after he entered the game as a sub in the second half and secured a point for the Red Bulls against Toronto FC on October 14, 2020, becoming the youngest player to score in his first two MLS games. On December 21, 2020, Clark was named New York Red Bulls Newcomer of the Year for the 2020 season.

Clark underwent an appendectomy in June 2021, causing him to miss a month of action. He ended his first full season with New York scoring 4 goals in 24 league matches.

RB Leipzig
On June 24, 2021, it was announced that Clark would move to Bundesliga side RB Leipzig, but would remain with New York on loan until the conclusion of the 2021 MLS season.

Loan return to New York Red Bulls
On February 9, 2022, he returned to the Red Bulls for the 2022 MLS season, with an option to extend the loan. Clark scored his first goal of the season on August 27, 2022 in a 3–1 victory against Inter Miami.

Personal life
Clark is of distant Austro-Hungarian descent through his mother.

Career statistics

Club

Honors
United States U20
CONCACAF U-20 Championship: 2022

References

External links
Profile at the RB Leipzig website

2003 births
Living people
New York Red Bulls II players
New York Red Bulls players
RB Leipzig players
USL Championship players
American soccer players
Association football midfielders
Soccer players from Minnesota
People from Hennepin County, Minnesota
Sportspeople from the Minneapolis–Saint Paul metropolitan area
Major League Soccer players
United States men's under-20 international soccer players
American people of Austrian descent
American people of Hungarian descent
Homegrown Players (MLS)
American expatriate soccer players
American expatriate soccer players in Germany